Hank Hall is a fictional character that appears in DC Comics. He first appeared in Showcase #75 (June 1968) as Hawk of Hawk and Dove. He later became the supervillain Monarch in the crossover event limited series Armageddon 2001. After that, he became known as Extant, and appeared in the limited series Zero Hour: Crisis in Time, as well as some related tie-ins.

Hawk has appeared in numerous television shows and films. He appeared in his first live-action adaptation in the television series Titans, played by Alan Ritchson in the first, second, and third seasons.

Publication history
The character first appeared in Showcase #75 (June 1968), created by Steve Ditko and Steve Skeates. He latter appeared as Monark in Armageddon 2001 #1 (May 1991), created by Archie Goodwin, Denny O'Neil, and Dan Jurgens, and as Extant in Zero Hour: Crisis in Time #4 (September 1994), created by Jurgens.

Fictional character biography

Hawk and Dove

Hank Hall was originally the superhero Hawk of Hawk and Dove. Hawk represented "chaos", while Dove represented "order". His brother Don Hall died during Crisis on Infinite Earths and was replaced with Dawn Granger.

Armageddon 2001: Monarch

Monarch was an oppressive tyrant from a bleak, dystopian Earth fifty years in the future. The people were unhappy with his rule, particularly a scientist named Matthew Ryder, an expert on temporal studies, who was convinced he could use his technology to travel back in time and prevent the maniacal ruler from ever coming to power. He learned that forty years ago, one of Earth's strongest and most powerful heroes would eventually turn evil and become Monarch, and ten years from that event he would conquer the world. During a time travel experiment, Matthew was transformed into a being called "Waverider", and began searching the timestream for the hero who would become Monarch, not knowing that Monarch was following him. When Monarch came into battle with the heroes of the present day, he killed Dove, and her enraged partner killed him for it. Removing the villain's mask, Hank discovered that he was Monarch, and donned the armor.

The reveal of Hank Hall as Monarch led to some controversy amongst the fan community; Monarch was originally intended to be revealed as Captain Atom, with clues in the story pointing towards this which had to be discarded when it was changed at the last minute. This change was due to the premature leaking of Monarch's identity. While Monarch was always supposed to be Captain Atom, this was supposed to be a secret. When Monarch's identity was prematurely leaked, DC decided to preserve the surprise of the story by switching Monarch's identity to that of Hank Hall.

As many fans pointed out, Hawk and Dove (vol. 3) Annual #2 had Hank Hall fighting Monarch face to face in 2001 with Hawk being the destroyer of Monarch. Dove allowed Waverider to see a multitude of futures and realize Hawk is Monarch.

Armageddon: The Alien Agenda
When hostile aliens encounter Monarch and Captain Atom in the past (sometime between 230 and 65 million years ago), they attempt to enlist both (with each figure having no knowledge of the other involved) to assist them in creating a wormhole. The wormhole's creation would destroy the universe in which the primitive Earth existed, but would allow the aliens to travel freely.

Zero Hour: Extant

Shortly after returning to the present, Monarch confronted Waverider and used his power to see the past and future to become aware of the power within him. It is explained at this point, that when Monarch killed Dove, her powers went directly into Hawk. Realising this, Monarch unleashes his hidden powers and becomes Extant. Extant then removes Waverider's timetravel device and joins forces with renegade Green Lantern Hal Jordan, now known as Parallax, in a plan to alter time as they saw fit.

His first act was to alter the future so that he could have a metahuman army at his disposal, mostly consisting of members of the Teen Titans; his plan was to amass an army so powerful that no one could interfere with his efforts to control time itself. Several armies of heroes banded together to stop his plans before they began in the 30th century, and altered history so that his followers never came to exist in the future.

Down, but not out, Extant began to strike back at the heroes at Ground Zero, the beginning of time. Parallax had warped several metahumans from various time periods together for the ultimate assault, and Extant hit the Atom with a chronal blast, de-aging him into a teenager. Sensing defeat was imminent, he escaped the fight, promising vengeance at a later date.

Extant would first reappear in the 1999 one-shot "Impulse: Bart Saves the Universe". In it, Extant picks a fight with the original Justice Society as a means of tricking the Linear Men into saving the life of an innocent bystander who was destined to die. The man they saved would now go on to develop a nuclear weapon that, when tested, would shift the Earth out of its proper orbit, causing massive changes in the timelines of some of Earth's greatest heroes. Among these changes, Hal Jordan never becomes Green Lantern, thus he never becomes Parallax, and never stops Extant from destroying all of time. Fortunately for the citizens of time, Impulse arrives and is barely able to defeat Extant and prevent the Linear Men from saving the doomed scientist.

He would engage the Justice Society again on a later date as he sought to acquire the reality-warping power of the Worlogog, recently dismantled by Hourman because he feared its power. Although Extant succeeded in his goal with the aid of Metron's stolen Mobius Chair, Doctor Fate learned from the imprisoned Mordru that when Hourman had dismantled the Worlogog, he had retained a small fragment of it, thus creating infinitesimal flaw in the prime Worlogog that the JSA could exploit.

After the resurrected Dove sacrificed herself to distract Extant, Hourman divided his Hour of Power amongst his teammates, thus granting them all immunity to Extant's reality warping powers for four minutes, each of them attacking him on a different temporal plane until they were able to separate him from the Worlogog. Following this setback, Extant again attempted to escape. Instead, Extant was teleported by Hourman and Metron, at Atom Smasher's behest, into the seat of an airplane whose crash Kobra had caused earlier (in his relative timestream). As a result of this, Atom Smasher's mother was saved (as she was on the plane when it crashed), but Atom Smasher replaced his mother with a weakened Extant, saving her life but murdering the super villain to stop his threat and ensure that the same number of people died on that plane who had died originally.

Hawk restored
In response to fan-criticism of Armageddon 2001, many of whose readers felt that the character of Hawk had been severely misused in the story's last-minute changes, DC Comics set about restoring the character as he had originally been intended; a hero. DC had already retconned Extant's portion of Hank Hall's timeline in issue 14 of JSA, dated September 2000, in which Metron announced his intention to erase the villain's "wretched timeline" with his Mobius Chair. This was the second issue of a 3-part story entitled The Hunt for Extant! (the details of which are listed above). After this, DC also retconned Monarch's portion of Hall's timeline with the final issue of the 6-part miniseries The Battle for Blüdhaven, dated September 2006, which now depicted Captain Atom's transformation into Monarch, as had been DC's original intention back in 1991. Hawk was restored, but he would not be revived until the final issue of Blackest Night.

Blackest Night

In the Blackest Night crossover, Hank Hall is reanimated as a member of the undead Black Lantern Corps. The black power rings also try to reanimate his brother Don, but are denied, stating "Don Hall of Earth at Peace". Hank then tracks down and attacks Dawn and the new Hawk (Holly Granger). After a short battle, Hank rams his hand into Holly's chest, ripping her heart out, and using it to charge his ring. Holly's body is then revived by a black ring, and the two attack Dawn together. Severely outmatched, Dawn retreats, with Hank and Holly giving chase. Hank and Holly follow Dawn to Titans Tower, where more Black Lantern Titans are attacking the living heroes. The two eventually overwhelm Dawn, with Holly plunging her hand into Dawn's chest. Dawn suddenly radiates a white energy that completely destroys Holly's body and ring. The other Black Lanterns, seeing Dawn as their greatest threat, attack her. However, she turns the light on them, destroying all but Hank, Tempest and Terra who quickly retreat. While battling the Black Lanterns at Coast City, Hank is later brought back to life by the power of the white light. Dawn has a vision of Don who tells Dawn that she can save Hank, and to not give up on him.

Brightest Day/Birds of Prey
At the beginning of the Brightest Day event, Hank and Dawn begin working together again as a crime-fighting duo. Dawn expresses worries over Hank's increasingly violent demeanor, but he simply brushes off her concerns. While stopping an army of powerful teenaged super villains in Gotham City, Hank and Dawn are invited by Zinda Blake to join the Birds of Prey. The two are immediately called by Oracle to help Black Canary and Huntress during their battle with a dangerous villainess known as the White Canary. Dove attempts to defeat her herself, but is surprised when White Canary is somehow able to dodge her attack and then draw blood from her. Hank and Dawn later encounter Deadman who Hank asks to resurrect Don. At a crater in Silver City, New Mexico, Deadman attempts to revive Don, only to be prevented from doing so by the Entity. As a number of onlookers (including Jackson Hyde) watch the Entity speak to the heroes, it instructs Hank to catch the boomerang that Captain Boomerang will throw at Dove.

After being injured trying to kill himself because of depression, Hank Hall is sent to a hospital while his teammates plan their next move. During his hospital stay, Hank has a vision of himself, clad in a White Lantern uniform and talking to Don. Just before the dream ends, Don assures his brother that he is at peace. Later, Dawn is transported to the Star City forest by the Entity, Hawk unintentionally went with her, but when the "dark avatar" made his presence known, the Entity tells them that they must protect the forest and withstand the ultimate savior, which is Alec Holland.

It was revealed that Captain Boomerang's mission for throwing the boomerang was to free Hawk as an avatar of war from the Lords of Chaos because his act of saving Dove would have broken their hold on him to be his own self. However, he failed to catch the boomerang and instead it was caught by Boston Brand, who ended up dying in the process and used his final act to move his white power ring to Alec Holland and bring back the Swamp Thing to cleanse the Green of Nekron's influence.

Powers and abilities
As Hawk he possessed a "danger sense transformation" which allowed him to change into a super-human with the powers of super strength, unlimited stamina, enhanced speed, increased agility, enhanced body density, extreme durability and healing factor. 

His partner Dove suppresses his violent nature, and without her Hank's rage becomes boundless.

As Monarch he possessed the same powers that he had as Hawk, along with a suit of highly durable armor that was crafted using advanced technology.

As Extant he had the powers of chronokinesis, energy projection, flight, and omniscience. After piecing together the Worlogog he became nigh-omnipotent.

While he was a member of the Black Lantern Corps, Hank wielded a black power ring which allowed him to generate black energy constructs. He was also able to perceive emotional auras. Whilst he was able to perceive Holly's aura as red for rage, he saw Dawn's as a pure white that his ring could not identify. While wearing the black power ring it lowers his original power by over 50%.

Other versions
 In the Elseworlds JLA: The Nail miniseries, and its sequel JLA: Another Nail, a version of Hank Hall exists, alongside the original Dove.
 Justice League of America (vol. 2) #26 features an alternate reality created by the trickster god Anansi. In this reality, an armored version of Hawk is seen.

In other media

Television
 Hank Hall as Hawk appears in Justice League Unlimited, voiced by Fred Savage. This version is depicted with a strong relationship with his brother Dove (Don Hall). In their self-titled episode, their fighting styles were thoroughly contrasted; Hawk employs brute-force, aggressive tactics, at times resembling a football player while Dove uses a blend of techniques reminiscent of aikido or judo, using his attacker's movements to fling aside. After defeating some thugs in a bar, Hawk and Dove are enlisted by Wonder Woman to help stop Ares from causing war in Kaznia. They are successful due to Dove's peaceful resistance against the rage-powered Annihilator. The brothers are last seen in the series finale "Destroyer" where they fight off Parademons alongside several other Justice League members. They later appear in the final scene running down the steps of the Metro Tower, along with Steve Ditko's fellow creations: the Question, the Creeper and Captain Atom.  
 Hank Hall as Hawk appears in Batman: The Brave and the Bold, voiced by Greg Ellis. In the teaser for "When OMAC Attacks!", he and Dove help Batman stop an intergalactic war between the Controllers and the Warlords of Okaara, but both have different approaches to this matter, escalating in their bickering and fight. Regardless, Batman gets the two sides' leaders to sign the peace treaty and end the war. They also briefly appear in the two-part episode "The Siege of Starro!" amongst the heroes under Starro's control.
 Hank Hall as Hawk appears in Titans, portrayed by Alan Ritchson, with Tait Blum as a younger version of the character. This version has no powers, but has high physical prowess gained from his past as a football player. In the series, Hank and his half-brother Don Hall are the original Hawk and Dove team that hunt down sexual predators, motivated by abuse that Hank's football coach inflicted on him as a child. After Don is killed in the same accident that kills Dawn Granger's mother, Hank has a romantic pairing with Dawn while subsequently being Hawk and Dove respectively. Ritchson left the series with the third season, where Jason Todd—under Scarecrow's influence—implants a bomb into Hank and manipulates Dawn into detonating it. Hank helps Donna Troy and Tim Drake escape from the afterlife before reuniting with Don.
 Ritchson also appear in the Arrowverse crossover Crisis on Infinite Earths. In the Supergirl episode "Crisis on Infinite Earths: Part One", Hawk appears via archive footage from the episode "Trigon". In the Legends of Tomorrow episode "Crisis on Infinite Earths: Part Five", Hank and Dawn appear via archive footage from the episode "Titans".

Web series
 Hank Hall as Hawk appears in DC Super Hero Girls with Dove (Dawn Granger). They appear as background students of Super Hero High.

References

Fictional mass murderers
DC Comics superheroes
DC Comics supervillains
Comics characters introduced in 1967
DC Comics characters with superhuman strength
DC Comics characters who can move at superhuman speeds
DC Comics characters with accelerated healing
Characters created by Steve Ditko
Characters created by Dennis O'Neil
Characters created by Dan Jurgens
Characters created by Archie Goodwin (comics)